The Douglas DC-4E was an American experimental airliner that was developed before World War II. The DC-4E never entered production due to being superseded by an entirely new design, the Douglas DC-4/C-54, which proved very successful.

Many of the aircraft's innovative design features found their way into the Nakajima G5N bomber after the single DC-4E prototype was sold to a Japanese airline and clandestinely dismantled for study by Nakajima at the behest of the Imperial Japanese Navy.

Design and development
The design originated in 1935 from a requirement by United Air Lines. The goal was to develop a much larger and more sophisticated replacement for the DC-3 before the first DC-3 had even flown.

Such was the initial interest from other airlines, that American Airlines, Eastern Air Lines, Pan American Airways and Transcontinental and Western Air (TWA) joined United, providing $100,000 each toward the cost of developing the new aircraft. As cost and complexity rose, Pan American and TWA withdrew their funds in favor of the Boeing 307 Stratoliner, which was anticipated to be less costly.

With a planned day capacity of 42 passengers (13 rows of two or more seats and a central aisle) or 30 as a sleeper transport (like the DST), the DC-4 (as it was then known) would seat twice as many people as the DC-3 and would be the first large aircraft with a nosewheel. Other innovations included auxiliary power units, power-boosted flight controls, alternating current electrical system and air conditioning. Cabin pressurization was also planned for production aircraft. The novel tail with three low vertical stabilizers enabled use of existing hangars and provided sufficient vertical fin area to allow the aircraft to take off with only two engines on one side operating. The wing planform was similar to the DC-3, with a swept leading edge and almost straight trailing edge. The four  Pratt & Whitney R-2180-A Twin Hornet 14-cylinder radials were all mounted with noticeable toe-out, particularly the outer pair.

Operational history
The prototype (NX18100, s/n 1601) first flew, without incident, on June 7, 1938 from Clover Field in Santa Monica, California, piloted by Carl Cover. Testing issues, however, delayed the Approved Type Certificate until May 5, 1939. It was used by United Air Lines for in-service evaluation during 1939. On June 9, 1939, when the DC-4 was in Dayton, Ohio, along with Carl Cover, Orville Wright was a passenger on a flight over the city.

The design was abandoned in favor of a marginally smaller, less-complex four-engined design, with a single vertical fin and 21 ft (6.4 m) shorter wingspan. This newer design was also designated DC-4, leading the earlier design to be redesignated DC-4E (E for "experimental"). In late 1939, the DC-4E was sold to Imperial Japanese Airways, which was buying American aircraft for evaluation and technology transfer during this period; at the behest of the Imperial Japanese Navy, it was reverse-engineered, becoming the basis for the unsuccessful Nakajima G5N bomber. To conceal its transfer to the Nakajima Aircraft Company for study, the Japanese press reported shortly after purchase that the DC-4E had crashed in Tokyo Bay.

Operators

 Imperial Japanese Airways

 United Airlines

Specifications (Douglas DC-4E)

See also

References

Notes

Citations

Bibliography

 Francillon, René J. McDonnell Douglas Aircraft since 1920, Volume 1. London: Putnam & Company Ltd., Second revised edition, 1988, 1979. 
 Pearcy, Arthur. Douglas Propliners: DC-1 – DC-7. Shrewsbury, UK: Airlife Publishing, 1995. .
 Westell, Freeman. "Big Iron, big engines & bigger headaches: Building the first experimental strategic bombers." Airpower, Volume 29, No. 6, November 1999.
 Yenne, Bill. McDonnell Douglas: A Tale of Two Giants. Greenwich, Connecticut: Bison Books, 1985. .

Further reading

 Grey, C.G. and Leonard Bridgman. Jane's all the World's Aircraft 1938. Newton Abbott, UK: David & Charles, Reprint 1972, First edition 1938. .

External links

 Photo of DC-4E being craned onto a ship for Japan from Flying magazine, December 1939

Cancelled aircraft projects
DC-04E
1930s United States airliners
Low-wing aircraft
Four-engined tractor aircraft
Aircraft first flown in 1938
Four-engined piston aircraft